Tashfeen Safdar is a Pakistani politician who had been a member of the National Assembly of Pakistan from August 2018 till January 2023.

Family
She is the grand daughter of the former President of Pakistan Fazal Elahi Chaudhry who was first President under the constitution of 1973.

Political career

She was elected to the National Assembly of Pakistan as a candidate of Pakistan Tehreek-e-Insaf (PTI) on a reserved seat for women from Punjab in 2018 Pakistani general election.

On 27 September 2018, Prime Minister Imran Khan appointed her as Federal Parliamentary Secretary for Housing and Works.

References

Living people
Punjabi people
Women members of the National Assembly of Pakistan
Pakistani MNAs 2018–2023
Pakistan Tehreek-e-Insaf MNAs
Year of birth missing (living people)
21st-century Pakistani women politicians